La Chorrera is a district (distrito) of Panamá Oeste Province in Panama. The population according to the 2000 census was 124,656; the latest official estimate (2019) is 199,708. The district covers a total area of 770 km². The capital lies at the city of La Chorrera.

Administrative divisions
The district is divided administratively into the following corregimientos:

La Chorrera
Barrio Balboa
Barrio Colón
Amador
Arosemena
El Arado
El Coco
Feuillet
Guadalupe
Herrera
Hurtado
Iturralde
La Represa
Los Díaz
Mendoza
Obaldía
Playa Leona
Puerto Caimito
Santa Rita

References

Districts of Panamá Oeste Province